James Matthew Lee,  (born March 29, 1937) is a former politician who was the 26th premier of Prince Edward Island from 1981 to 1986. He was the leader of the PEI Progressive Conservative Party from 1981 to 1987.

Born in Charlottetown, Prince Edward Island, the son of James Matthew Lee and Catherine Blanchard, Lee was educated at Saint Dunstan's University. He married Patricia Laurie in 1960.

Island MLA
After a successful career in real estate and development, Lee ran in 1974 as a Progressive Conservative but failed to win a seat in the provincial legislature. Lee was elected to the PEI Legislature one year later after winning a by-election in 1975. Lee was re-elected in 1978, 1979 and 1982. Lee ran for the leadership of the Progressive Conservative Party of PEI in 1976 and narrowly lost to future premier J. Angus MacLean. When MacLean was elected Premier in 1979, Lee served in the provincial cabinet as Minister of Social Services and Minister of Tourism, Parks and Conservation from 1979 to 1980 and as Minister of Health and Social Services from 1980 to 1981.

Premier
In 1981 Premier Angus MacLean resigned as PC leader and James M. Lee won the PC leadership convention held to choose MacLean's successor, thus becoming the 26th Premier of Prince Edward Island.  Lee led his party to re-election in 1982. In April 1982, he was sworn into the Privy Council of Canada by Her Majesty Queen Elizabeth II.

A major accomplishment by the Lee government was the successful negotiation with the federal government to obtain the establishment of a school of veterinary medicine at the University of Prince Edward Island. Lee's government was defeated in the 1986 election which also cost him his seat in the legislature to Wayne Cheverie.

Life after politics
He was appointed to be a commissioner on the Canadian Pension Commission and in 1998 became chairman of the PEI Workers' Compensation Board.

References 

1937 births
Living people
People from Charlottetown
Premiers of Prince Edward Island
Members of the King's Privy Council for Canada
Progressive Conservative Party of Prince Edward Island MLAs
Progressive Conservative Party of Prince Edward Island leaders
Saint Dunstan's University alumni